Hemigomphus theischingeri is a species of dragonfly of the family Gomphidae, 
known as the rainforest vicetail. 
It is a small, black and yellow dragonfly, endemic to northern Queensland, Australia, where it inhabits rainforest streams.

Etymology
Hemigomphus theischingeri is named after Günther Theischinger, a specialist in Australian Odonata.

Gallery

See also
 List of Odonata species of Australia

References

Gomphidae
Odonata of Australia
Insects of Australia
Endemic fauna of Australia
Taxa named by J.A.L. (Tony) Watson
Insects described in 1991